Freedom Church is a global non-denominational evangelical Christian church whose vision is to "Connect Anyone Anywhere to a Life Changing relationship with Jesus". The church is headquartered in Hereford in the United Kingdom with locations in Africa, North America, Asia and Europe. Freedom Church is a member of the Evangelical Alliance

History 
Freedom Church was founded as New Life Church by Pastors Gary and Heather Snowzell in 1988. Originally situated in Leominster in Herefordshire, in around 2005 it moved to Hereford and was renamed Freedom Church.

In 2011, Freedom Church partnered with the Southern Baptist megachurch NewSpring Church in South Carolina. The purpose of the partnership was to help Freedom Church plant churches all over the world. This arrangement came to an end in December 2017. In 2015, Freedom Church started to give 10% of its income as a tithe to NewSpring Church, though this has since ceased.

Freedom Church's first planted church was in Cardiff in 2011, and it has since started locations in Africa, North America, Asia and Europe.

In 2015, Freedom Church's location in Hereford moved location to a converted cinema and nightclub.

During the COVID-19 pandemic, Freedom Church in Worcester, England supported a local food bank with storage space.

Music 
Freedom Church has produced 3 albums, 2 singles and an EP.

Albums

 Thunder. Reign (2018)
 Uncharted (2015)
 Everything Changes (2012)

Singles and EPs

 Courage & Fire - EP (2009)
 Running The Race (Live At The Cave) - Single (2018)
 This is Love - Single (2014)

Media 
Freedom Church has a YouTube channel and its messages have been shown on the TV channels TBN UK and TBN Africa.

Freedom Heroes 
Freedom Church in Kampala, Uganda runs an organisation called 'Freedom Heroes' which takes homeless boys aged 12–21 off the streets of Kampala, Uganda and supports them with housing, a "Street School", and "Street Church" with the stated aim of reuniting them with their families. Sponsors from the United States can visit their beneficiaries on a missions trip with NewSpring Church.

Freedom Heroes is a registered charity in both Uganda and the United Kingdom.

Notable people 
Stuart Anderson, who sat on Herefordshire Council as councillor for Kings Acre ward and was later elected as the Member of Parliament for Wolverhampton South West in the 2019 general election, and whose wife is also a member of the church, is a member of the church and has appeared on Songs of Praise to promote the church. His former business eTravelSafety previously shared the same registered address as Freedom Church Hereford.

Freedom Church has also maintained a connection with NewSpring Church's founder Perry Noble, who continued to deliver sermons for Freedom Church after being ousted from NewSpring Church.

Controversies 
In 2011, the Hereford Times publicised allegations of arranged marriages, fight clubs, and mass baptisms. They also alleged that the church encouraged its young members to turn to church leaders for relationship advice rather than friends or family, and that the church and its youth group, 2XL, had links to Herefordshire Council. 2XL reportedly received council funding to deliver certain youth services in local schools. Freedom Church strenuously denied the claims, saying "We have never encouraged 14-year-old girls to 'consider marrying older men'", "Nor have we ever implied that if a girl were to be baptised 'it will lead to a relationship with someone in the church'", and "We do not brainwash people [...] if Freedom Church is not the place for [new people], they are quite free to leave".

In 2012, the police were called on Freedom Church volunteers, who were giving out sweets with attached leaflets to children outside the gates of Whitecross Hereford High School in order to promote the Church's youth club.

In 2013, a Freedom Church staff member at the newly-opened Siem Reap church attracted criticism after posting that Cambodia "...is a spiritually dead place but there is an increasing anticipation amongst the team and a sense that this city is ours. Despite all the false worship, rampant sex trafficking and the go-to party destination in Southeast Asia, we know that Jesus has given us this city". Freedom Church were accused of proselytising, which is technically illegal in Cambodia (although rarely enforced in practice), and preying on the poor.

Swansea University 
In 2014, the Swansea University student newspaper reported that the church was banned from campus by the university after concerns were raised about student welfare. The article quoted Kevin Childs, Director of Student Services, saying: "Concerns have been raised by various organisations and individuals in Wales and elsewhere about the operational methods used by the Freedom Church to recruit members by targeting vulnerable members of society and their cultic style of operation". Freedom Church responded saying it was "baffled by the Swansea University ban, claiming the institution had 'never spoken to us about anything.'"

The University later retracted saying: "We have not officially banned this organisation from holding services and events on campus. Permission is not granted to any faith group unless they are a society registered with the student’s union. The Freedom Church is not registered with the student’s union. This is what we meant by the term affiliated." A University Spokesperson further clarified: "Only affiliated faith organisations are permitted to hold services on the campus. Members of the Freedom Church were not removed from campus but the 250 posters which appeared just before the Freshers arrived were taken down. Only approved posters are permitted on campus."

An ex-member told Wales Online that they joined the church at a vulnerable time of their life but felt the church 'drove a wedge in families'. When they were asked to attend a £1,000 year-long course they declined and described it as a 'red flag'. It was also claimed that members "never" had relationships outside of the church. The church responded by saying that they were “great believers in the importance and strength of the family even when families sometimes have a different perspective” and was "more transparent than just about any church".

The Evangelical Alliance strongly denied that the Freedom Church is a cult, saying that it has worked alongside the organisation for over 20 years. The national director for Evangelical Alliance Wales Reverend Elfed Godding said, "We are fully supportive of what they do. They're an orthodox Christian church; they have a good track record of social engagement, of caring for needy people. I'm not quite sure what the issue of complaint was about."

Locations 
Freedom Church has churches across the world, with locations in the following cities:
 Europe

 Hereford 
 Cardiff 
 Worcester 
 Birmingham 
 Cheltenham 
 Rotterdam 
 Limassol 

Africa

 Kampala 
 Cape Town 
 Kigali 
 Musanze  
 Nairobi 

 Asia

 Siem Reap 
 Battambang 
 Phnom Penh 
 Chennai 
 Bengaluru 
 Chiang Mai  

North America

 Raleigh, North Carolina

References

External links 
 Website
 Freedom Church on YouTube
 Charity Details

Evangelical megachurches in the United Kingdom
Churches in Herefordshire